Cellach mac Cerbaill (some sources "Callough"; nicknamed Cellach of the Hard Conflicts) was king of Osraige from 905 to his death in 908.

History

Cellach mac Cerbaill was a son of Cerball mac Dúnlainge, king of Osraige (died c. 888).  Cellach was married to Echrad ingen Matudán, daughter of Matudán mac Aeda, king of Ulaid (or Ulster) (died c. 950), by whom he had a son, Donnchad mac Cellaig, king of Osraige (died c. 976). Matudán mac Aeda was the son of Áed mac Eochocáin (died c. 919), son of Eochocán mac Áedo (died c. 883) and his wife, Inderb ingen Máel Dúin of the Cenél nEógain, daughter of Máel Dúin mac Áeda, king of Ailech (died c. 867). Máel Dúin mac Áeda was the son of Áed Oirdnide mac Néill, king of Ailech (died c. 819), a member of the Cenél nEógain dynasty of the northern Uí Néill.

Cellach took part in the battle of Gowran in 893.  He came to the throne after the deposition of his older brother Diarmait in 905.  Cellach was slain in the battle of Mag Ailbe fighting on the side of the illustrious king-bishop of Cashel Cormac mac Cuilennáin in 908.  The Annals of Inisfallen record Cellach mac Cerbaill's death in 908:

However, the Annals of the Four Masters state that this conflict was called the Battle of Bealach-Mughna and assign it to have taken place in 903:

His brother Diarmait was afterwards reinstated to the throne by their first cousin, high king Flann Sinna.

Legacy
He was ancestor of the later medieval Mac Giolla Phádraig family, and the Icelandic Landnámabók (in which he is called Kjallakr Kjarvalson) names him as an ancestor of some of Iceland's early settlers.

See also
Kingdom of Ossory
Kings of Osraige

References

External links
Fitzpatrick - Mac Giolla Phádraig Clan Society

Kings of Osraige
FitzPatrick dynasty
10th-century Irish monarchs